The Rwanda Football Federation (French: Fédération Rwandaise de Football Association, FERWAFA; "Rwandan Association Football Federation"), is the official governing body of association football in Rwanda. It was founded in 1975 and affiliated with CAF and FIFA in 1976 and 1978, respectively. It organizes the Rwanda Premier League and the Rwanda Women's Football League and oversees the men's and women's national teams.

Principals

External links
Official Website
Rwanda at the FIFA website
 Rwanda at CAF Online
Rwanda FA on Twitter

References

Rwanda
Football in Rwanda
Sports organizations established in 1972